Wafaq ul Madaris Al Salafiyyah is a federation of seminaries of Ahl-i Hadith faction in Pakistan. It was established in 1955 at Faisalabad.

References

External links
 Wafaq ul Madaris

Madrasas in Pakistan
Schools in Faisalabad